Hasnain Ali Mirza (born 29 May 1983), is a Pakistani lawyer and barrister who is elected as Member of the Provincial Assembly (MPA). He is the son of Zulfiqar Mirza and federal minister Fahmida Mirza. He is the grandson (through father) of lawyer and politician, (late) Zafar Hussain Mirza.

Early life 
Mirza was born on 29 May 1983 in Karachi to Fahmida Mirza and Zulfiqar Mirza. He was elected in 2011 as barrister and Member of Provincial Assembly.

References

External links 
Hasnain Ali Mirza
 Do You Know Barrister Hasnain Mirza? - Pakistan Political News
 Barrister Hasnain Ali Mirza's Profile

Living people
1983 births
Pakistani barristers
Lawyers from Karachi
Sindh MPAs 2008–2013
Sindh MPAs 2013–2018
Hasnain
Grand Democratic Alliance MPAs (Sindh)